Zee One was a general entertainment channel in Germany, which was launched at 8pm on 28 July 2016.

It brought a wide variety of Bollywood productions to Germany, such as series, musicals, comedies, drama films, romantic films, family films and music videos. The station was a commercial free-to-air TV station, with regular programming being interrupted by commercial breaks.

The channel ceased broadcasting on 31 May 2020.

Audience share

References

Zee Entertainment Enterprises
Television channels and stations established in 2016
Television channels and stations disestablished in 2020
2016 establishments in Germany
2020 disestablishments in Germany
Defunct television channels in Germany
Television stations in Germany
German-language television stations
Mass media in Munich